The following lists events that happened during 2008 in New Zealand.

Population
 Estimated population as of 31 December: 4,280,300
 Increase since 31 December 2007: 34,500 (0.81%)
 Males per 100 Females: 95.7

Incumbents

Regal and vice regal
 Monarch – Elizabeth II
 Governor-General – Anand Satyanand

Government
2008 was the third and last year of the 48th Parliament, which was dissolved on 3 October. A general election was held on 8 November to elect the 49th Parliament, which saw the Fifth National Government elected.

Speaker of the House – Margaret Wilson then Lockwood Smith
Prime Minister – Helen Clark to 19 November, then John Key
Deputy Prime Minister – Michael Cullen to 19 November, then Bill English
Minister of Finance – Michael Cullen to 19 November, then Bill English
Minister of Foreign Affairs – Winston Peters to 29 August, then Helen Clark (acting) to 19 November, then Murray McCully

Party leaders
Labour – Helen Clark to 11 November, then Phil Goff
National – John Key
Progressive – Jim Anderton
New Zealand First – Winston Peters
United Future – Peter Dunne
Act – Rodney Hide
Greens – Jeanette Fitzsimons and Russel Norman
Māori Party – Tariana Turia and Pita Sharples

Judiciary
Chief Justice — Sian Elias

Main centre leaders
Mayor of Auckland – John Banks
Mayor of Tauranga – Stuart Crosby
Mayor of Hamilton – Bob Simcock
Mayor of Wellington – Kerry Prendergast
Mayor of Christchurch – Bob Parker
Mayor of Dunedin – Peter Chin

Events

January
 22 January – State funeral for Sir Edmund Hillary

February

March

April
 5 April – A propane explosion at a coolstore in Tamahere kills firefighter senior station officer Derek Lovell, and seriously injures seven others.

May
 8 May – The Tapuae Marine Reserve is established.

June
 5 June – A newly redesigned flag for the Governor General of New Zealand is flown for the first time at Government House, Auckland.

July
 1 July – Rail transport network is renationalised as KiwiRail
 11 July – Police Sergeant Derek Wootton (52) is struck and killed by a vehicle fleeing police, while laying road spikes at Titahi Bay.

August
 1 August – Crown entities Land Transport New Zealand and Transit New Zealand merge to form the NZ Transport Agency
 16 August – Dunedin Hospital is put in lockdown for a week after approximately 170 staff and patients fall ill to a norovirus outbreak, resulting in 2,300 appointments and procedures being delayed.

September
 5 September – Fonterra advise Prime Minister Helen Clark of the 2008 baby milk scandal.
 7 September – The Taputeranga Marine Reserve is opened.
 11 September – Undercover police Sergeant Don Wilkinson (47) is fatally shot in Mangere, after being discovered attempting to secretly fix a tracking device to a car.
 24 September - GO Wellington dispute - an industrial dispute between the GO Wellington bus company and drivers

October
On the 17th The Dominion Post Billboard  Heading Reads "Market Madness"
There is also a graph on the Billboard showing the NZX taking a big dive .
This was indicative of the worlds sharemarkets in turmoil.

November

 8 November – John Key and the New Zealand National Party win the 2008 general election. John Key is able to form a Government and in Helen Clark's speech that she resigns as leader of the New Zealand Labour Party.
 9 November – Michael Cullen resigns as deputy leader of the Labour Party.
 19 November – John Key is sworn in as Prime Minister of New Zealand.
 27 November – 2008 Air New Zealand A320 test flight crash. Air New Zealand A320 Airbus crashes into the Mediterranean during a test flight, killing five New Zealand and two German air crew.

December

Holidays and observances
 6 February – Waitangi Day
 21 March – Good Friday
 23 March – Easter Sunday
 24 March – Easter Monday
 25 April – Anzac Day
 2 June – Queen's Birthday
 5 June – Matariki
 27 October – Labour Day

Arts and literature

New books

Awards
BPANZ Book Design Awards - In association with Spectrum Print and the New Zealand Listener id=13
BEST BOOK Title: Bill Hammond: Jingle Jangle Morning
BEST COVER Winner: Bill Hammond: Jingle Jangle Morning
NON-ILLUSTRATED Winner: Dear to Me
ILLUSTRATED Winner: Bill Hammond: Jingle Jangle Morning
EDUCATIONAL Winner: Astronomy Aotearoa NCEA Level 1 by Robert Shaw 
CHILDREN’S Winner: The King's Bubbles by Ruth Paul

Music
May - New Zealand Music Month
 3 September: Technical Awards for the Vodafone New Zealand Music Awards
 8 October: Vodafone New Zealand Music Awards

Performing arts

 Benny Award presented by the Variety Artists Club of New Zealand to Suzanne Lynch MNZM.

Television
Freeview|HD Digital television is launched.
The country's first Chinese television channel, CTV8 (Chinese Television 8) is launched in early October.

Sport

Cricket
 New Zealand men's cricket team, the Black Caps plays three test matches against England and draws the series, each team having won a game

Horse racing

Harness racing
 New Zealand Trotting Cup: Changeover
 Auckland Trotting Cup: Gotta Go Cullen

Thoroughbred racing

Netball
 The ANZ Netball Championship begins in April 2008.

Motorsport

Olympic Games

 New Zealand sends a team of 182 competitors across 17 sports.

Paralympics

 New Zealand sends a team of 30 competitors across seven sports.

Rugby league
The New Zealand national rugby league team won the 2008 Rugby League World Cup.
The New Zealand Warriors finished 8th in the National Rugby League and in the playoffs made it through to the semi-finals, beating minor premiers the Melbourne Storm in the progress.
The inaugural season of the new Bartercard Premiership saw Auckland defeat Canterbury 38-10 in the grand final.

Rugby union

Rowing

Shooting
Ballinger Belt – Brian Carter (Te Puke)

Soccer
30 October – 16 November – New Zealand hosts the inaugural FIFA U-17 Women's World Cup. Matches are held in Albany, Christchurch, Hamilton and Wellington.
 The Chatham Cup is won by East Coast Bays AFC who beat Dunedin Technical 1—0 in the final.

Tennis

Births
 18 September – Silent Achiever, Thoroughbred racehorse
 23 September – Zurella, Thoroughbred racehorse

Deaths

January
 1 January – Joan Dingley, mycologist (born 1916)
 2 January – Lindsay Poole, botanist and forester (born 1908)
 4 January
 Graham Percy, artist, designer and illustrator (born 1938)
 Bert Walker, politician (born 1919)
 6 January – Charlie Steele, Jr., association football player (born 1930)
 10 January – Sir George Laking, diplomat (born 1912)
 11 January – Sir Edmund Hillary, mountaineer, explorer and philanthropist (born 1919)
 16 January – Hone Tūwhare, poet (born 1922)

February
 12 February – Ron Chippindale, pilot, air accident investigator (born 1933)
 14 February – June Schoch, athlete (born 1926)
 16 February – K. Radway Allen, fisheries biologist (born 1911)
 19 February – Barry Barclay, filmmaker (born 1944)
 28 February – Peter Bannister, botanist (born 1939)

March
 13 March – Tessa Birnie, concert pianist (born 1934)
 18 March – Ruth Dallas, poet and children's author (born 1919)
 21 March – Merv Wallace, cricketer (born 1916)

April
 2 April – Sir Geoffrey Cox, newspaper and television journalist (born 1910)
 6 April – Tony Davies, rugby union player (born 1939)
 10 April – Greg Hough, association football player (born 1958)
 11 April – Fraser Colman, politician (born 1925)
 12 April – Dame Augusta Wallace, jurist, first woman District Court judge (born 1929)
 15 April – Mahinārangi Tocker singer–songwriter (born 1955)

May
 4 May – Colin Murdoch, pharmacist, veterinarian and inventor (born 1929)
 8 May – William L. Holland, Pacific affairs academic (born 1907)
 20 May – Mihi Edwards, writer, social worker, teacher (born 1918)

June
 1 June – Doug Zohrab, diplomat (born 1917)
 4 June – John Armitt, wrestler (born 1925)
 5 June
 Colin Kay, athlete and politician, mayor of Auckland (1980–83) (born 1926)
 Bruce Purchase, actor (born 1938)
 24 June
 Neill Austin, politician (born 1924)
 Charlie Dempsey, association football administrator (born 1921)
 27 June – Lyn Davis, rugby union player (born 1943)
 30 June – Just An Excuse, Standardbred racehorse (foaled 1998)

July
 16 July – Bob Walton, police officer (born 1921)
 17 July – Sir Graham Speight, jurist (born 1921)
 25 July – Walter Metcalf, physical chemistry academic (born 1918)
 31 July – Falani Aukuso, Tokelauan public servant

August
 6 August – Ken Going, rugby union player (born 1942)
 9 August – Bob Cunis, cricket player and coach (born 1941)
 16 August – Rei Hamon, artist (born 1919)
 25 August – Hardwicke Knight, historian and photographer (born 1911)
 31 August – Victor Yates, rugby union and league player (born 1939)

September
 7 September – Sir Hamish Hay, politician, mayor of Christchurch (1974–89) (born 1927)
 8 September – Ron Guthrey, soldier, politician, mayor of Christchurch (1968–71) (born 1916)
 11 September – Sue Garden-Bachop, rugby union player, coach and administrator (born 1961)
 13 September – Duncan Laing, swimming coach (born 1933)
 15 September
 Peter Hanan, swimmer (born 1915)
 Arthur Stubbs, soldier, oldest New Zealand war veteran (born 1904)
 21 September – Al Hobman, professional wrestler (born 1925)
 25 September
 Wynne Bradburn, cricketer (born 1938)
 Brian Donnelly, politician and diplomat (born 1949)

October
 2 October – Rob Guest, actor and singer (born 1950)
 14 October – Dame Daphne Purves, educator (born 1908)
 15 October – Des Townson, yacht designer (born 1934)
 26 October – Neil Purvis, rugby union player (born 1953)
 29 October – John Darwin, statistician and public servant (born 1923)

November
 6 November – Kevin J. Sharpe, mathematician, theologian and archaeologist (born 1950)
 7 November – Hedley Howarth, cricketer (born 1943)
 8 November – Hugh Cook, science fiction writer (born 1956)
 27 November – Mike Minogue, politician (born 1923)
 29 November – Robert Wade, chess player (born 1921)

December
 6 December – Peter Wardle, plant ecologist (born 1931)
 13 December – John Drake, rugby union player (born 1959)
 16 December – Peg Batty, cricketer (born 1920)
 24 December – Ian Ballinger, sports shooter (born 1925)

See also
List of years in New Zealand
Timeline of New Zealand history
History of New Zealand
Military history of New Zealand
Timeline of the New Zealand environment
Timeline of New Zealand's links with Antarctica

For world events and topics in 2008 not specifically related to New Zealand see: 2008

References

External links

 
New Zealand
New Zealand
Years of the 21st century in New Zealand
2000s in New Zealand